Make It with You is a 2020 Philippine romantic drama television series broadcast by ABS-CBN. The series premiered on the network's Primetime Bida evening block and worldwide via The Filipino Channel from January 13 to March 13, 2020, replacing Starla.

Series overview

Episodes

Season 1

References

Lists of Philippine drama television series episodes